The canton of Rai is an administrative division of the Orne department, northwestern France. It was created at the French canton reorganisation which came into effect in March 2015. Its seat is in Rai.

It consists of the following communes:
 
Aube
Les Authieux-du-Puits
Beaufai
Champ-Haut
Échauffour
Écorcei
Fay
La Ferté-en-Ouche
La Genevraie
Godisson
La Gonfrière
Lignères
Mahéru
Ménil-Froger
Le Ménil-Vicomte
Le Merlerault
Nonant-le-Pin
Planches
Rai
Sainte-Gauburge-Sainte-Colombe
Saint-Evroult-Notre-Dame-du-Bois
Saint-Germain-de-Clairefeuille
Saint-Nicolas-de-Sommaire
Saint-Pierre-des-Loges
Saint-Symphorien-des-Bruyères
Touquettes

References

Cantons of Orne